Eric Butorac and Lovro Zovko were the defending champions, but decided to not compete together this year.
Butorac partnered with Harsh Mankad and Zovko with Dušan Vemić, but they all lost in the first round (Butorac/Mankad was eliminated by Denis Gremelmayr and Björn Phau, Vemić/Zovko was eliminated by Johan Brunström and Lukáš Rosol).Scott Lipsky and David Martin won the final against Gremelmayr and Phau 6–4, 5–7, [12–10].

Seeds

Draw

Draw

External links
 Main Draw

Open de Rennes - Doubles
2010 Doubles